The Moog Rogue is a monophonic analog synthesizer produced by Moog Music in the early 1980s. Very basic in its design and use, the Rogue featured a 32-note keyboard and two VCOs. VCO number 2 is tunable between a half-step below to an octave above VCO number 1.  This allows the Rogue to play atonal sounds like the Moog Prodigy. The Rogue did not have features to allow the user full flexibility to program the patch settings. However, the VCF and the VCA were simple to operate.  The design of the hard-wired patch system was well thought out (considering its size and cost) and a wide variety of sounds and modulation effects are possible.  The Rogue also includes a Sample-and-Hold feature that the Prodigy does not.  The synthesizer is most commonly used for its powerful bass.  The Rogue is similar in some respects to the famous ARP Odyssey, though smaller and less versatile.

Moog Music was criticized for repackaging the Rogue as the Taurus II, changing the design to a pedal-operated synthesizer with little difference in sound quality.

The Rogue is very similar in design and sound to the less-expensive Moog Concertmate MG-1, also made by Moog Music, but re-branded for Realistic around the same time for home use.  This was perhaps the first example of a keyboard designed for the home musician.

Notable users
 Tina Weymouth of Talking Heads
 Saint Etienne
 Six Finger Satellite
 Add N to (X)
 Greg Anderson of Sunn O)))
 Will Butler of Arcade Fire
 Vince Clarke
 Jeff DeCuir of Hyperbubble
 Electrosexual
 Peter Gabriel
 Jonny Greenwood of Radiohead
 Shahzad Ismaily
 Howard Jones
 Julian Koster of Neutral Milk Hotel
 Jimmy LaValle of The Album Leaf
 Ronnie Martin of Joy Electric
 John McEntire of Tortoise
 Merzbow
 Mr. Oizo
 NTRSN
 Anni Rossi
 Mike Rutherford of Genesis
 Cevin Soling of The Neanderthal Spongecake
 David Swanson of Whirlwind Heat
 Nancy Whang of LCD Soundsystem
 Glazed Baby
 Armand Gonzalez
 Shehzad Choudhry of The Field Recorders
 Christoph Heemann
 The Juan MacLean

External links
 Moog Rogue Myspace Page
 Moog Rogue at Synthmuseum.com
 Moog Rogue at Vintage Synth Explorer
 Moog Rogue at Moog Archives

Rogue
Monophonic synthesizers
Analog synthesizers